was a town located in Tagata District, Shizuoka Prefecture, Japan.

As of March 1, 2005, the town had an estimated population of 19,602 and a density of 566 persons per km². The total area was 34.63 km².

On April 1, 2005, Nirayama, along with the towns of Izunagaoka and Ōhito (all from Tagata District), was merged to create the city of Izunokuni and thus it no longer exists as an independent municipality.

During the Kamakura and Muromachi period, Niirayama was the site of a castle belonging to the Hōjō clan, and the later Hōjō clan. During the Edo period, it was the location of the daikansho offices of the Tokugawa shogunate controlling Izu Province.

Known for its strawberry crop, Nirayama sees many visitors from bigger cities (such as Tokyo) coming for seasonal picking and the views of Mount Fuji.

External links
 Izunokuni official website 

Dissolved municipalities of Shizuoka Prefecture
Populated places disestablished in 2005
2005 disestablishments in Japan
Izunokuni